Black capitalism is a political movement among African Americans, seeking to build wealth through the ownership and development of businesses.  Black capitalism has traditionally focused on African-American businesses, although some critics and activists have also pushed for increased representation of Blacks in corporate America.

Historical roots
Roots of black capitalism can be found in the lives of "Free Negroes" during times of the American Enslavement. Many records exist reporting the development of economic wealth by these "Free Negroes".

The earliest recorded words touting the economic upliftment of African Americans by an African American was written by Lewis Woodson under the pen name "Augustine" in the Coloured American newspaper. Woodson helped found Wilberforce University and the first AME Theological seminary, Payne Theological Seminary and was an early teacher and mentor of Martin Delany.

A prominent southern affluent black was A. G. Gaston who was, at times, instrumental in the civil rights movement. Galston was influenced by Booker T. Washington, who was an early leader at the Tuskegee Institute. Another wealthy African American was Robert Reed Church, who founded the nation's first black-owned bank, Solvent Savings, in 1906.

There are many historical and current examples of neighborhoods of prominent and affluent blacks in American history. Some include the historical Highland Beach, Maryland and more recently Mount Airy in Philadelphia, Pennsylvania,  Prince George's County, Maryland and DeKalb County, Georgia. Mainstream media identifies this with some interest.

A more focused movement of black capitalism can be found in the popular magazine Black Enterprise.

Strands of black capitalism
There are two strands of black capitalism: the one focuses on success as a group, while the other focuses on success as an individual.

Group success
One strain of black capitalism is immersed in the ethic of African Americans building wealth together, as exemplified in the Kwanzaa value of "ujamaa" meaning 'cooperative economics'. A prominent proponent and example of this cooperative economics is Russell Simmons who can be seen advocating the building of not only individual black businesses but communities of black businesses. Simmons has made the comment that black MBA students and graduates have the notion that they want to own their own businesses, not to simply be employed in someone else's business.

A recent effort to standardize black capitalism as a movement was introduced in two books: Black Labor: White Wealth and the more recent book Powernomics by Dr Claud Anderson. In these two books Dr. Anderson outlines a schema on which black wealth can be coordinated and developed through a nine-issue plan.

Some see this group success strain of black capitalism as a form of Social entrepreneurship which aims to build businesses that are oriented around providing services and goods that benefit the community in which they were built. Others see this as an outgrowth of the communal and tribal ethic attributed to traditional African cultures.

Black Capitalism over the last thirty years has been driven to the forefront by entertainment. Yet the question as posed in an article on Huffington Post by Antonio Moore "The Decadent Veil: Black America's Wealth Illusion" questions are rising is this type of limited approach a help. "As black celebrity has been shown to millions of people, millions of times, the story of real lives has also been lost, and with it the engine that thrust forward the demand for social justice by the masses. The heartbeat of social action is to recognize your mistreatment, and demand better. With each presentation of Kobe Bryant's 25 million dollar a year contract, or Oprah's status as the sole African American billionaire a veil of false calm is created within the overall American economic psyche about the immense black wealth disparity."

Individual success
A parallel, but possibly opposing, strain of black capitalism stems from the American ideal of building individual wealth. Prominent examples of this can be popular figures such as Oprah Winfrey and Robert L. Johnson. The complaint leveled against the adherents of individual success from advocates of group success is that individually wealthy African Americans have made millions of dollars and that that in and of itself has made very little contribution to the plight of African Americans in general.

In general, African Americans and the media sometimes point to this phenomenon as "black flight" or "selling out" where affluent blacks move out of predominantly black neighborhoods into affluent white neighborhoods. A history of some of this is documented in the book Our Kind of People: Inside America's Black Upper Class by Otis Graham.

Issues facing black capitalism

As distinct from racial integration
The notion of racial integration is such that African Americans should be able to move and operate in a predominately white society safely. This effort at racial integration concerns mostly public spaces and private hiring practices. It is thought that attempts and movements supporting racial integration are efforts to enable blacks to assimilate into white institutions.

Black capitalism is an effort to position blacks as the owners of land, the means of production, and businesses that own either or both. The aim of black capitalism is to bolster self-reliance, both individually and communally.

Black anti-capitalism
There are also two strands of thinking in African America, and specifically Black Nationalism, that is against capitalism as an economic system in all of its forms. One strand is against capitalism on the basis of the historical treatment of Africans and the African Diaspora, i.e. slavery, subjugation, and colonization. Another strand is against capitalism through strict political critiques, i.e. socialist. Many critics of capitalism from within the black community blend the two positions, however the reasoning behind them are distinct. A prominent black political critic was C. L. R. James. Two of the most popular black anti-capitalist books are How Europe Underdeveloped Africa by Walter Rodney and How Capitalism Underdeveloped Black America by Manning Marable. These books give analysis on how capitalism as an economic system has not raised the quality of living for the African Diaspora.

Violence against black capitalism
Examples of the explicit and public opposition to African American economic success have diminished since the Civil Rights Movement. However, before this period of American transition, there are a few notable violent attacks against prosperous African American communities including the Tulsa Race Riot and the Rosewood massacre.

Economic disparity
Blacks on average have a lower net worth than whites in America. This is especially pertinent in the creation of new businesses. One of the most common forms of collateral for loans to open businesses is home equity. With the historical and current differences in lending patterns toward blacks and whites, the option of using home equity to borrow against in order to open a business is diminished.

The article "America's Financial Divide" added context to racial wealth inequality, stating
...nearly 96.1 percent of the 1.2 million households in the top one percent by income were white, a total of about 1,150,000 households. In stark contrast, in the same piece black households were shown as a mere 1.4 percent of the top one percent by income, that's only 16,800 homes. In addition, their median net asset worth was just . In the piece the author stated "If you're white and have a net worth of about $356,000, that's good enough to put you in the 72nd percentile of white families. If you're black, it's good enough to catapult you into the 95th percentile." This means 28 percent of the total 83 million white homes, or over 23 million white households, have more than $356,000 in net assets. While only 700,000 of the 14 million black homes have more than $356,000 in total net worth.

See also
 African-American socialism
 Civil rights movement (1865–1896)
 Civil rights movement (1896–1954)
 African-American business history
 Timeline of the civil rights movement

Related magazines and books
Black Enterprise Magazine

References

External links

Our Kind of People: Inside America's Black Upper Class by Otis Graham

African-American history
African-American society
Capitalism
Political movements in the United States